Monsted or Mønsted may refer to:
Mønsted, village in Denmark

People with the surname
Peder Mørk Mønsted (1859-1941), Danish painter
Otto Mønsted (1838-1916), Danish margarine manufacturer

See also
Monsted-Vincent, an aircraft